95  or 95th may refer to: 
 95 (number)
 one of the years 95 BC, AD 95, 1995, 2095, etc.
 95th Division (disambiguation)
 95th Regiment
 95th Regiment of Foot (disambiguation)
 95th Squadron (disambiguation)
 Atomic number 95: americium
 Interstate 95
 Microsoft Office 95
 Saab 95
 Windows 95

See also
 9 to 5 (disambiguation)
 
 List of highways numbered